The Eleventh Hour is a Canadian television drama series which aired weekly on CTV from 2002 to 2005.

The show revolves around the reporters and producers at a fictional television news magazine series, The Eleventh Hour. Unhappy with the newsmagazine's shrinking audience, the network has brought in a new executive producer, Kennedy Marsh, to reorient the show in a more ratings-driven tabloid journalism direction.

The tension between the ratings imperative and the more traditional journalistic ethics of the show's senior staff is the primary conflict that drives the show, but storylines also include the team's efforts to get the stories that will make it to air each week.

The Eleventh Hour was produced by Alliance Atlantis, Canada's largest film and television production house. It aired in the U.S. on Sleuth, under the title Bury the Lead, to distinguish it from a CBS series with a similar name.

Ratings

Although the show started off poorly in the Canadian television ratings, attracting an average of just 400,000 viewers each week, its audience during the start of its 2004 season was sufficiently high that CTV ordered a third season. However, ratings did not improve further. The third season, already ordered, aired irregularly on Saturday nights with very little promotion, and proved to be its last. The final season also received a Best Dramatic Series Gemini Award despite the cancellation.

The Eleventh Hour was the latest in a lengthy line of drama series at CTV which had high-profile launches but were quickly marginalized to little-watched weekend timeslots and ultimately cancelled. However, it outlasted several other recent CTV dramas, including Power Play, The City, and The Associates, which each lasted two seasons.

The show's theme song for season 3 is "Weapon", by Matthew Good.

Cast 
 Sonja Smits as correspondent Megan Redner
 Shawn Doyle as producer Dennis Langley
 Waneta Storms as producer Isobel Lambert
 Tanya Reid as executive producer Kennedy Marsh
 Jeff Seymour as correspondent Kamal Azizi
 Peter MacNeill as network news head Warren Donohue
 Inga Cadranel as researcher Brooke Fairburn
 Scott McCord as researcher James Joy
 Matt Gordon as legal counsel Murray Dann
 Jonas Chernick as editor Gavin Kowalchuk
 John Neville as interviewer Deaton Hill

Main Crew
Creators:   Semi Chellas, Ilana Frank
Executive Producers:   Ilana Frank, Semi Chellas, David Wellington,
Directors: David Wellington, Kelly Makin, Philip Earnshaw, T.W. Peacocke, Graeme Campbell, Milan Cheylov, Stephen Reynolds  
Writers: Semi Chellas, Esta Spalding, Tassie Cameron, Frank Borg,  Sean Reycraft, Peter Wellington, Karen Walton, Morwyn Brebner

Awards and nominations
The show was nominated for 14 Gemini Awards in 2003, and won for Best Dramatic Series, Best Actor in a Leading Role (Seymour) and Best Supporting Actor (MacNeill).
The show was nominated for Best Dramatic Series Gemini Awards again in 2004.
In 2005, the show won Gemini Awards for Best Dramatic Series and for Best Writing for Semi Chellas and Tassie Cameron.

Episode list

Season 1 
 Mad As Hatters
 I'm Mad As Hell
 The Source
 A Low, Dishonest Decade
 Tree Hugger
 A Modern Mata Hari
 Not Without My Reefer
 The 37-Year Itch
 Don't Have a Cow
 Shelter
 Cell Phone Slaves
 The RASH Troops of Error
 Hall of Mirrors

Season 2 
 Cowboy
 Stormy Petrel
 Hard Seven
 Swimmers
 Wonderland
 Gone Baby Gone
 Nadir
 Rather Be Wrong
 Georgia
 I'll Build Me An Island
 Strange Bedfellows
 The Revenge Specialist
 The Missionary Position

Season 3 
 Eden
 In Spite of All the Damage
 Megan Ice Cream
 Bedfellas
 A Virgin Walks into a Bar
 ZUGZWANG
 Hit Delete
 Kettle Black
 In Another Life
 The Miracle Worker
 Special Delivery
 Das Bootcamp
 Bumpy Cover

External links 

 
 The Eleventh Hour (fan Web site)

CTV Television Network original programming
Gemini and Canadian Screen Award for Best Drama Series winners
2000s Canadian drama television series
2002 Canadian television series debuts
2005 Canadian television series endings
Television series by Alliance Atlantis
Television series about television
Television series about journalism
English-language television shows